The Human Rights Measurement Initiative finds that the Federated States of Micronesia are fulfilling 94.9% of what it should be fulfilling for the right to health based on its level of income. When looking at the right to health with respect to children, the Federated States of Micronesia achieve 97.1% of what is expected based on their current income. In regards to the right to health amongst the adult population, the country achieves only 91.9% of what is expected based on the nation's level of income. The Federated States of Micronesia fall into the "good" category when evaluating the right to reproductive health because the nation is fulfilling only 95.8% of what the nation is expected to achieve based on the resources (income) it has available.

Life expectancy at birth in the Federated States of Micronesia was 66 for men and 69 for women in 2018.

Pingelap in Pohnpei State is notable for the prevalence of an extreme form of color blindness called achromatopsia, and known locally as maskun. Approximately 5% of the atoll's 3000 inhabitants are afflicted.

Healthcare
The healthcare system developed under the US naval administration after World War II when the US Navy sponsored students to train as medical and nurse assistants in Guam. There was a program of  dispensary building in the 1960s, followed by the construction of hospitals, both financed and staffed by the US government.  Under the Pacific Island Health Care Program patients were sent to Tripler Army Medical Center in Hawaii for treatment not available in Micronesia.  After independence the government had difficulty in meeting these costs, and cut back on local facilities in order to pay for referrals, which still had financial and technical support from the United States.

Total expenditure on health in the country was $473 per head in 2014.  This was about 13.7% of GDP.

Hospitals in the Federated States of Micronesia.

 Chuuk State Hospital in Weno in Chuuk State
 Kosrae State Hospital in Tofol, Lelu municipality on Kosrae island in Kosrae state
 Pohnpei State Hospital in Kolonia on Pohnpei in Pohnpei State
 Yap State Hospital in Colonia on Yap in Yap State
 Genesis Hospital, Pohnpei, a private 36-bed hospital

These hospitals have a total of 362 beds. Tertiary health services are generally referred outside the country.

In the territory there are also 5 health centers and 92 dispensaries.

References